Max Spicker (August 16, 1858 – October 15, 1912) was a German American organist, conductor and composer.

Biography
Spicker was born in Königsberg, Prussia. He studied piano with Louis Köhler for five years, and then attended Leipzig Conservatory from 1877-1879.

In 1882 he moved to New York city, where he began conducting the "Beethoven Männerchor" and worked as a reader for the music publisher G. Schirmer. He was Director of Groschel's Brooklyn Conservatory from 1888 to 1895, after which he was a teacher of harmony and counterpoint at the National Conservatory in New York. He also served for 12 years as choir director of Temple Emmanuel on Fifth Avenue.

He was a member of the New York Musician's Club and an honorary member of the Society of American Cantors.

He died October 15, 1912, in New York City, survived by a wife and son.

Composer and editor
Spicker eventually became an editor for G. Schirmer, editing such collections as the four-volume Anthology of Sacred Song and the five-volume Operatic Anthology. In their day, both publications became standard anthologies for young singers. He also revised the T. Tertius Noble edition of Handel's Messiah for Schirmer, which remains in wide use.

As a composer, most of his works were for solo voice or chorus, although he did complete several larger works.

He was also an arranger of works for voice and orchestra.  His orchestral version of Ethelbert Nevin's duet O That We Two Were Maying was recorded by Victor Records in May 1914 by two important singers of the time, Alma Gluck and Louise Homer.  Victor also recorded his arrangement of the Jacopo Peri aria  with baritone Reinald Werrenrath in January 1915.  The Victor Catalog also includes an arrangement of Mattei's Non é ver in English for tenor and orchestra, recorded by tenor Lambert Murphy in 1912, and Die Heimat for vocal quartet, recorded by "The Manhattan Quartet" in 1911.

He also did Jewish liturgical music.  Strimple named him as one of "the most prominent Jewish liturgical musicians at the beginning of the century".  In 1901 Spicker and William Sparger jointly published a Sabbath evening and morning service.  It included works by non-Jewish composers, such as a setting of "S'u Sheorim" based on a melody in Gounod's Faust.

Large musical works
Suite for orchestra
Incidental music to Schiller's Demetrius
Der Pilot, cantata for baritone solo, male chorus and orchestra

Other vocal compositions
Published by G. Schirmer unless noted
Die Linde (men's chorus, text by F. Bercht), op. 15, unknown publisher, 1886
O schneller mein Ross (song, text by Geibel), op. 20, 1886
Mondnacht (men's chorus, text by Eichendorff), op. 19, no. 1, published by F. Luckhardt, Berlin, 1887
Tragödie (song, text by Heine), op. 14, published by F. Luckhardt, Berlin, 1887
Zwei Lieder, op. 8, published by F. Luckhardt, Berlin, 1887
Frühlingstraum (text by W. Müller)
In dieser Stunde (text by R. Prutz)
Zwei Lieder, op. 10, published by F. Luckhardt, Berlin, 1887
Nur vor dem Abschiednehmen ist mir bang (text by F. X. Seidl)
Abendfriede (text by Eichrodt)
Zwei Lieder (texts by Heinrich Heine, op. 18, published by F. Luckhardt, Berlin, 1887
Leise zieht durch mein Gemüth
Die Wasserlilie
A collection of glees and part songs for mixed voices, 1890
Shall I Wed Thee? (song, text by Bayard Taylor), op. 37, 1896
In Thee, O God, do I put my trust (sacred song for alto, Psalm 71), op. 48, 1899
Oh! Thou, whose Pow'r Tremendous ("Hymn-Anthem with Alto Solo"), op. 49, 1899
Fear Not, O Israel, choral anthem, op. 50, 1900
Why Art Thou Cast Down, My Soul?, sacred song, op. 54, 1902
Evening and Morning (voice and piano or organ, text by Rev. I. G. Smith), op. 56, 1905
Zwei Männerchöre, op. 40, published by H. Flammer, 1926
unknown
Es blickt so still der Mond mich an
Misc. other choral compositions
Many other songs

Editions
Published by G. Schirmer unless noted
Aus aller Herren Länder (a collection of folk songs arranged for male choir)
Anthology of Modern French Song, 1939
Anthology of Sacred Song, 4 volumes
Bach, Christmas Oratorio, vocal score, 1939
Balfe, The Bohemian Girl (opera in 3 acts), vocal score, 1902
The Cecilia collection of part-songs for two women's voices, 1898
Fifty-two Sacred Songs, You Like to Sing, 1939
Handel, The Messiah (oratorio)
Obbligato Songs (songs with violin or 'cello and piano), 1905
Operatic Anthology, 5 volumes
The Seminary series: a collection of two and three part songs for women's voices with piano accompaniment, 1890
Seventy glees and part songs for male voices, 1884–96
Songs of Germany (81 folksongs and popular songs), 1904
Synagogical Service, 2 volumes, with W. Sparger, 1901

Footnotes

References 
.

1858 births
1912 deaths
German conductors (music)
German male conductors (music)
German composers
Pupils of Carl Reinecke
Musicians from Königsberg
19th-century German male musicians